The Woman's Club House in Manhattan, Kansas was built in 1911. It was designed by St. Louis, Missouri architects Helfensteller, Hirsch & Watson. It was listed on the U.S. National Register of Historic Places in 1980.

References

Clubhouses on the National Register of Historic Places in Kansas
Buildings and structures completed in 1911
Women's club buildings
History of women in Kansas
Manhattan, Kansas
National Register of Historic Places in Riley County, Kansas
Bungalow architecture in Kansas
1911 establishments in Kansas